The 1992 Dwars door België was the 47th edition of the Dwars door Vlaanderen cycle race and was held on 25 March 1992. The race started and finished in Waregem. The race was won by Olaf Ludwig.

General classification

References

1992
1992 in road cycling
1992 in Belgian sport
March 1992 sports events in Europe